Mount Washington Regional Airport  is a public airport located  east of downtown Whitefield in Coos County, New Hampshire, USA. The Civil Air Patrol maintains a composite squadron at this location.

It is included in the Federal Aviation Administration (FAA) National Plan of Integrated Airport Systems for 2017–2021, in which it is categorized as a local general aviation facility.

It features pilot-controlled lighting. Traffic pattern altitude is  MSL, and pilots must make right traffic for runway 28 unless winds require use of Runway 10 during landing.

Local attractions include: Mountain View Grand Hotel , Mount Washington Hotel  (including Bretton Woods Mountain Resort), Mount Washington Cog Railway, Santa's Village and Six Gun City theme parks (Jefferson).  Other local towns include Franconia (and its Cannon Mountain Ski Area), Littleton, Bethlehem and Lancaster, where the Coos County Fair is held each summer.  A regional view can be enjoyed from the lookout tower at historic Weeks State Park, located on Mount Prospect in Lancaster.

References

External links 
Mount Washington Regional Airport
Mount Washington Regional Airport (allroutes.to)

Airports in New Hampshire
Transportation buildings and structures in Coös County, New Hampshire